The Hausa Kingdoms, also known as Hausa Kingdom or Hausaland, was a collection of states started by the Hausa people, situated between the Niger River and Lake Chad (modern day northern Nigeria). Hausaland lay between the Western Sudanic kingdoms of Ancient Ghana, Mali and Songhai and the Eastern Sudanic kingdoms of Kanem-Bornu. Hausaland took shape as a political and cultural region during the first millennium CE as a result of the westward expansion of Hausa peoples. They arrived to Hausaland when the terrain was converting from woodlands to savannah. They started cultivating grains, which led to a denser peasant population. They had a common language, laws and customs. The Hausa were known for fishing, hunting, agriculture, salt-mining, and blacksmithing.

By the 14th century, Kano had become the most powerful city-state. Kano was the base for the trans-Saharan trade in salt, cloth, leather, and grain. The Hausa oral history is reflected in the Bayajidda legend, which describes the adventures of the Baghdadi hero, Bayajidda culminating in the killing of the snake in the well of Daura and the marriage with the local queen Magajiya Daurama. According to the legend, the hero had a child with the queen, Bawo, and another child with the queen's maid-servant, Karbagari.

Though the Hausa states shared the same lineage, language and culture, the states were characterized by fierce rivalries with each other with each state seeking supremacy over the others. They constantly waged war on each other and would often work with invaders to the detriment of their sister states, hindering their collective strength.

Mythology

According to the Bayajidda legend,  Hausa states were founded by the sons and grandsons of Bayajidda, a prince whose origin differs by tradition, but official canon records him as the person who married Daurama, the last Kabara of Daura, and heralded the end of the matriarchal monarchs that had erstwhile ruled the Hausa people. According to the most famous version of the story, the story of the Hausa states started with a prince from Baghdad called "Abu Yazid". When he got to Daura, he went to the house of an old woman and asked her to give him water but she told him the predicament of the land, how the only well in Daura, called Kusugu, was inhabited by a snake called Sarki, who allowed citizens of Daura to fetch water only on Fridays. Since "Sarki" is the Hausa word for "King", this may have been a metaphor for a powerful figure. Bayajidda killed Sarki and because of what he had done the queen married him for his bravery. After his marriage to the queen the people started to call him Bayajidda which means "he didn't understand (the language) before ".

Hausa Bakwai
The Hausa Kingdoms began as seven states founded according to the Bayajidda legend by the six sons of Bawo and himself, the son of the hero and Magajiya Daurama in addition to the hero's son, Biram or Ibrahim, of an earlier marriage. The states included only kingdoms inhabited by Hausa speakers:

Daura
Kano 
Katsina
Zaria (Zazzau/Zegzeg)
Gobir
Rano
Hadejia (Biram)

Since the beginning of Hausa history, the seven states of Hausaland divided up production and labor activities in accordance with their location and natural resources. Kano and Rano were known as the "Chiefs of Indigo." Cotton grew readily in the great plains of these states, and they became the primary producers of cloth, weaving and dying it before sending it off in caravans to the other states within Hausaland and to extensive regions beyond. Biram was the original seat of government, while Zaria supplied labor and was known as the "Chief of Slaves." Katsina and Daura were the "Chiefs of the Market," as their geographical location accorded them direct access to the caravans coming across the desert from the north. Gobir, located in the west, was the "Chief of War" and was mainly responsible for protecting the empire from the invasive Kingdoms of Ghana and Songhai.

Banza Bakwai 
According to the Bayajidda legend, the Banza Bakwai states were founded by the seven sons of Karbagari ("Town-seizer"), the son of Bayajidda and the slave-maid, Bagwariya. They are called the Banza Bakwai, meaning "bastard/bogus seven", on account of their ancestress' slave status.

Zamfara (state inhabited by Hausa-speakers)
Kebbi (state inhabited by Hausa-speakers)
Yauri (also called Yawuri)
Gwari (also called Gwariland)
Kwararafa (the state of the Jukun people)
Nupe (state of the Nupe people)

History

Zenith
The Hausa Kingdoms were first mentioned by Ya'qubi in the 9th century and they were by the 15th century trading centers competing with Kanem-Bornu and the Mali Empire. The primary exports were slaves, leather, gold, cloth, salt, kola nuts, animal hides, and henna. At various moments in their history, the Hausa managed to establish central control over their states, but such unity has always proven short. In the 11th century the conquests initiated by Gijimasu of Kano culminated in the birth of the first united Hausa Nation, although it was short-lived. During the reign of King Yaji I (1349–85) Islam was first introduced to Kano. Many Muslim traders and clerics used to come from Mali, from the Volta region, and later from Songhay. King Yaji appointed a Qadi and Imam as part of the state administration. Muhammad Rumfa (1463–99) built mosques and madrassahs. He also commissioned Muhammad al-Maghili to write a treatise on Muslim governance. Many other scholars were brought in from Egypt, Tunis, and Morocco. This turned Kano into a center of Muslim scholarship. Islamization facilitated the expansion of trade and was the basis of an enlarged marketing network. The 'Ulama provided legal support, guarantees, safe conducts, introductions and many other services. By the end of the fifteenth century, Muhammad al-Korau, a cleric, took control of Katsina declaring himself king. 'Ulama were later brought in from North Africa and Egypt to reside in Katsina. An 'Ulama class emerged under royal patronage. The Hausa rulers fasted Ramadan, built mosques, kept up the five obligatory prayers, and gave alms (zakat) to the poor. Ibrahim Maje (1549–66) was an Islamic reformer and instituted Islamic marriage law in Katsina.Generally Hausaland remained divided between the Muslim cosmopolitan urban elite and the local animistic rural communities. During this time period, Leo Africanus briefly mentions in his book Descrittione dell’Africa descriptions of the political and economic state of Hausaland during that time although it is unknown if he actually visited it; Hausaland seems to have been mostly of a tributary status by Songhai as in his description of Zamfara he comments that "their king was slaughtered by the Askiya and themselves made tributary" and the same is said for the rest of the region.

Fall

Despite relatively constant growth from the 15th century to the 18th century, the states were vulnerable to constant war internally and externally. By the 18th century, they were economically and politically exhausted. Famines became very common during this period and the Sultans engaged in heavy taxation to fund their wars. Though the vast majority of its inhabitants were Muslim, by the 19th century, they were  conquered by a mix of Fulani warriors and Hausa peasantry, citing syncretism and social injustices. By 1808 the Hausa states were finally conquered by Usuman dan Fodio and incorporated into the Hausa-Fulani Sokoto Caliphate.

References

Further reading

External links
Map showing Bornu and the Hausa Bakwai  Part II
Britannica
Art & Life in Africa
BBC
Amana Online The Fulani Empire of Sokoto
Amana Online Hausaland and the Hausas

Countries in medieval Africa
History of Northern Nigeria
Sahelian kingdoms
Hausa